A jockey is a professional horse racer.

Jockey may also refer to:

Art and entertainment
 Disc jockey (or a DJ or deejay), a person who selects and plays recorded music
 Jocky Wilson, a darts player
 Jockeys (TV series), a documentary reality television series that premiered in 2009 on Animal Planet
 Jockey (film), a 2021 American drama film
 Radio personality, a person who has an on-air position in radio broadcasting
 Robot jockey, a machine used to race camels
 VJ (media personality), a video jockey
 Broadcast jockey (or BJ), a term used to refer to Korean streamers
 Jockey, zombie-like creatures from the video game Left 4 Dead 2

Other
 Jockey, Indiana, a community in the United States
 Jockey International, a clothing manufacturer
 Jockey wheel, a retractable 'third' wheel on a trailer

See also
Jock (disambiguation)
Jockey Club (disambiguation)